Mutaher al-Masri is a Yemeni politician. He was former is Yemeni Minister of the Interior from 9 May 2008 to 7 December 2011.
Following the anti-government protests in Yemen, President Ali Abdullah Saleh fired all members of the Cabinet of Yemen on 20 March 2011. They will remain in function until a new government is formed.

See also
Cabinet of Yemen

References

21st-century Yemeni politicians
Living people
Year of birth missing (living people)

Interior ministers of Yemen
21st-century Yemeni military personnel
Governors of Saada
People from Dhamar Governorate
Mujawar Cabinet